Mauro Torta (born 17 September 1959) is an Italian lightweight rower. He won a gold medal at the 1986 World Rowing Championships in Nottingham with the lightweight men's four.

References

1959 births
Living people
Italian male rowers
World Rowing Championships medalists for Italy